Agrotis chretieni is a moth of the family Noctuidae. It is found in France and on the Iberian Peninsula.

Adults are on wing from May to June in one generation.

Recorded foodplants include Quercus, Populus alba and Ulex.

External links

Noctuidae Periurbana De Monforde
Lepiforum.de

Agrotis
Moths of Europe
Moths described in 1903